Maya Youssef (born 1984) is a Syrian musician and composer based in the United Kingdom who plays the qanun. She has performed on the BBC Proms and WOMAD.

Personal life and education
Maya Youssef was born in 1984 in Damascus, Syria, into a family of artists and writers. Her father is the writer and journalist , and her mother 	Rose Makhlouf is a translator. 

Hassan M. Youssef  has been accused of using his art for regime propaganda, and the script he wrote for  “The Man of the Revolution”, produced by the Syrian General Film Corporation, seeks to reinforce the message that the regime is innocent of the charges of using chemical weapons  
The above article, dated 28 October 2018 and entitled “Syrian cinema in the service of the dictator to obliterate his crimes” adds: “Since it came to power in Syria, the regime has realized that cinema and the arts in general play an important role in “propaganda” or propaganda for a repressive regime, either directly by promoting its ideology, position and point of view, or indirectly by producing films by creators of its citizens (who may not be in the country)…….(transl. by Google)

In an episode of “Wednesday Talk” on state TV on 7 February 2019, Hassan M. Youssef claimed that “Damascus is now safer than New York,” in an attempt to encourage Syrian refugees to return to the country. 

Meanwhile, a Syrian government website described Maya as a “Syrian refugee”, in a report dated 23 October 2018. There is no explanation of how or why she is a refugee, with her father a senior figure in the regime’s propaganda operation. 

Most notably Maya’s father threatened Boris Johnson (when he was foreign secretary) in an article he wrote in September 2016: 

In a post on 12 Feb 2023 about the earthquake, Maya's father refers to the affected areas controlled by the Syrian government, namely the "governorates of Aleppo, Lattakia, Hama and Tartous". He omits to mention Idlib, the governorate under the control of the Syrian opposition.  

In this same post, Hassan M. Youssef attacks an Opinion piece in the Washington Post dated 9 Feb 2023 by Wa'el Alzayat, a Middle East policy expert at the US Department of State and a former coordinator of US aid in Syria, calling Alzayat a “son of a snake”. 
Youssef criticises Alzayat for arguing against the lifting of sanctions against the Syrian regime. He does not mention Alzayat’s statement that, since the start of the civil war in Syria in 2011, “Most of this assistance (USD 16 million) is “actually spent in regime-controlled areas, because the regime prohibits most of this aid from ever reaching opposition-held communities”. Nor does he mention Alzayat’s call for “immediate and direct outreach and assistance to Syrians in the north-western corner of the country”. Youssef’s only interest seems to be in those areas of Syria under the control of the regime.

At the age of seven she started to study music at the Sulhi al-Wadi Institute of Music in Damascus. Encouraged by her mother, the nine-year-old Maya chose the violin as her main instrument, before switching to the qanun.

At  the age of 12, Youssef won the Best Musician Award in Syria's National Music Competition for Youth. Youssef was a founder member of the Syrian Female Oriental Band (SFOG) in 2003. She completed her degree in music in 2007 after studying with the Syrian composer and qanun player Salim Sarwa and Azerbaijani musician Elmira Akhundova. She was also given master classes by the Turkish qanun player .

Youssef moved to Dubai in 2007 to focus on her solo career. In 2009 she was offered a post to teach the qanun and Arabic music at the Department of Music and Musicology, Sultan Qaboos University, Oman. She now lives in the UK, having moved to London in 2012 under the Arts Council England’s Exceptional Talent scheme.

Musical and academic career
In July 2014, Youssef appeared at the BBC Proms, playing as a solo artist and as part of an ensemble, with Kuljit Bhamra (tabla) and Adam Oscar Storey (double bass). At the end of 2016 she signed a contract to record with the independent record label Harmonia Mundi.

Her debut album Syrian Dreams  was produced by Joe Boyd and released in November 2017 under the Harmonica Mundi label. Youssef explained, "The main trigger that made me create Syrian Dreams was the Syrian war and the loss of my homeland. And it’s only by embarking on that spiritual journey of constant meditation and of finding home within God and within myself that I started to feel consolable and started to feel that I have my own home within me."

In 2018 she won the Newcomer Award this week at the Songlines Music Awards in London. She has performed on the BBC Proms and WOMAD. In May 2019, she was invited by the British Council to play at the European Cultural Festival in Algiers.

 Youssef is the Director of the School of Oriental and African Studies (SOAS) Middle Eastern Ensemble at the University of London. Her research at the SOAS involves investigating how music can be used as a healing tool for children in Syrian refugee camps.

Discography
Syrian Dreams (November 2017)
The Last Post (Soundtrack) (2017)
Gold (Soundtrack) (2017)
Finding home (2022)

References

External links
 BBC Radio 3 - In Tune edition featuring Youssef  performing Walk With Me on the qanun

Living people
British women singers
Syrian women musicians
Lyricists
British jazz violinists
Qunan players
1984 births